The Dalhousie Group is a geologic group in New Brunswick. It preserves fossils dating back to the Devonian period.

See also

 List of fossiliferous stratigraphic units in New Brunswick

References
 

Devonian New Brunswick